Contactin-3 is a protein that in humans is encoded by the CNTN3 gene.

References

External links

Further reading